The Directorate-General for Translation (DGT) translates texts for the European Commission into and out of the EU's 24 official languages, and a few others when needed. The department deals exclusively with written texts.

Responsibilities
 translate laws, policy papers, reports, correspondence, etc. drafted by or sent to the Commission
 help the Commission communicate with the public, thereby helping citizens understand EU policies
 edit original documents drafted by Commission authors
 advise Commission departments on language and on managing multilingual websites
 ensure correct terminology in all official EU languages, as documented in the interinstitutional database Interactive Terminology for Europe - IATE

Leadership and organisation
 European Commissioner for Budget and Administration
 Director-General (acting) Christos Ellinides

External links
  – homepage of the DGT

Translation
Language policy of the European Union
Translation organizations